Sahara Love is a 1926 British-Spanish silent drama film directed by Sinclair Hill and starring Marie Colette, Jean Dehelly and Sybil Rhoda. It was based on a novel by A.L. Vincent. The production company held a competition, the winner of which was given a leading role in the film.

Synopsis
Eleanor Vallance turns down Hugh Trevor for another man. After travelling with her new husband to Algiers she discovers he is a violent bully.

Cast
 Marie Colette - Eleanor Vallance 
 Jean Dehelly - Hugh Trevor
 Sybil Rhoda - Melody Rourke 
 Edward O'Neill - Sir Max Drake 
 Gordon Hopkirk - Sheik

References

Bibliography
 Bell, Melanie & Williams, Melanie. British Women's Cinema. Routledge, 2010.
 Low, Rachel. The History of British Film: Volume IV, 1918–1929. Routledge, 1997.

External links

1926 films
British silent feature films
1926 drama films
British drama films
Spanish silent films
1920s English-language films
Films directed by Sinclair Hill
Films based on British novels
Stoll Pictures films
Films set in Algeria
British black-and-white films
1920s British films
Silent drama films